Tulsa is a city in Oklahoma, United States.

Tulsa may also refer to:
Tulsa (film), starring Susan Hayward and Robert Preston
USS Tulsa, the name of two U.S. Navy ships, a gunboat and a never-built cruiser
Tulsa (book), a photo collection by Larry Clark
Tulsa, a female professional wrestler from the Gorgeous Ladies of Wrestling
University of Tulsa, a private university in the city of Tulsa
Tulsa Golden Hurricane, the athletic teams for the university
"Tulsa", a song by Billy Joe Royal
"Tulsa", a song written and recorded by Rufus Wainright from his album Release the Stars
Tulsa, a moth genus in the family Pyralidae